Jared Frayer (born October 7, 1978) of Miami, Florida is an American freestyle wrestler who won the 2012 U.S. Olympic Trials at 66 kg and competed at the 2012 Summer Olympics.

Early life
Frayer was born in Miami, Florida but grew up in Clearwater, Florida where his father coached at Clearwater Countryside High School . He was a three-time Florida High School State Wrestling Champion.

College career
Frayer was a two-time NCAA All-American at the University of Oklahoma, with a best finish of 2nd place. He has since been an assistant wrestling coach with the Virginia Tech Hokies.

International career
Frayer defeated Brent Metcalf 2-0 at the finals of the 2012 U.S. Olympic Trials to qualify for the USA Olympic Team. At the 2012 Olympics, Frayer would make it to the round of 16, where he lost to Ali Shabanau of Belarus.

References

External links
 

1978 births
Living people
American male sport wrestlers
Wrestlers at the 2012 Summer Olympics
Olympic wrestlers of the United States
Sportspeople from Miami